The Shire of Broomehill was a local government area in the Great Southern region of Western Australia, about  south of Katanning and about  south-southeast of the state capital, Perth.

History

The Broomehill Road District was gazetted on 19 May 1892. On 1 July 1961, it became a shire following changes to the Local Government Act which reformed all remaining road boards into shires. On 1 July 2008, after ten months of planning and preparation, it merged with the neighbouring Shire of Tambellup to form the Shire of Broomehill-Tambellup.

Wards
The shire was originally divided into wards, but as at 2007, it was a single electorate with eight representative councillors.

Towns and localities
 Broomehill
 Peringillup

References

Broomehill
Great Southern (Western Australia)
1892 establishments in Australia